Waki Dam, is an earthfill dam on a local river named Godavari near Pachora, Jalgaon district in the state of Maharashtra in India.

Specifications

Purpose
 Irrigation

See also
 Dams in Maharashtra
 List of reservoirs and dams in India

References

Dams in Jalgaon district
Dams on the Godavari River
Year of establishment missing